Tomáš Kalas (born 15 May 1993) is a Czech professional footballer who plays for Bristol City and the Czech Republic national team. He plays as a centre-back, but has also been played as a right-back.

Having begun his career at Sigma Olomouc, Kalas signed for Chelsea for a reported £5.2 million in 2010. He spent most of his tenure out on loan, first back at Sigma, then at Vitesse Arnhem, 1. FC Köln, Middlesbrough, Fulham and Bristol City. He transferred to Bristol City fully in 2019.

Kalas earned 42 caps and scored once for the Czech youth international teams, and made his senior international debut in 2012. He was included in the Czech Republic squad for UEFA Euro 2020.

Club career

Chelsea

Early career

Born in Olomouc, Kalas started his career in his hometown with Sigma Olomouc, making his debut in a 2–0 victory over Slovan Liberec on 5 May 2010. He then signed for Premier League champions Chelsea, on 7 July 2010, for a reported figure of around £5.2 million, although it was agreed that he would stay at Sigma Olomouc for the 2010–11 season. Kalas arrived at Chelsea for the second half of the 2010–11 season and made his Chelsea reserve team debut in a 2–2 away draw to Aston Villa on 21 February.

Loans to Vitesse
On 22 August 2011 Kalas joined Dutch football club Vitesse Arnhem on loan for the 2011–12 season. He was given the number 2 jersey. He made his debut for Vitesse on 17 September 2011 against Roda JC Kerkrade which ended in a 5–0 win for Vitesse.

In March 2012, Kalas admitted that he did not yet know where he will be playing next season, but was happy on loan at Vitesse. "Ideally I'll stay another year at this club," he told. "Simply put, there are three options. I'll stay here, go back to Chelsea or they will loan me to another club abroad. In late March I will talk with my managers about next season and know more."

On 17 May 2012, Kalas scored the opening goal in the 22nd minute, for Vitesse against RKC Waalwijk; the match ended in a 3–1 win for Vitesse. This goal was Kalas' first goal of his professional career.

On 11 July 2012, Kalas rejoined Vitesse on a new loan deal until the end of the 2012–13 season. He also extended his contract with Chelsea until the summer of 2017.  Kalas scored his first Eredivisie goal of the season for Vitesse in a 3–0 defeat of FC Groningen on 16 September 2012.

During his second loan spell at Vitesse, Kalas was mainly deployed as a right-back instead of his natural centre-back. Kalas ended up playing a total of 76 games overall competition during his two-year stay at Vitesse.

2013–14 season
On 10 July 2013 Chelsea manager José Mourinho confirmed Kalas would stay and fight for his place at Chelsea for the coming season. During Chelsea's 2013 pre-season Asia tour, Kalas made 3 appearances for Chelsea, in wins against the Singha All Stars, the Malaysian XI, and the Indonesian XI. During pre-season training, Kalas suffered fractured fibula, cutting his action with the first-team short as the rest of the team flew over to America for the Guinness International Champions Cup.

After finally recovered from his injuries, Kalas made his competitive debut for the senior squad on 29 October 2013 as a substitute for Juan Mata, in a 2–0 win at Arsenal in the League Cup. Speaking of his role at Chelsea, Kalas said in an interview with a Czech chat show: "I am a player for training sessions. If they need a cone they put me there instead."

On 18 March 2014, Kalas made his Champions League debut against Galatasaray, replacing Willian in stoppage time; Chelsea won 2–0.

On 27 April 2014, Kalas was given his debut in the Premier League for Chelsea, at Anfield against Liverpool, starting in place of the injured John Terry. He played the whole 90 minutes in a 2–0 win that kept Chelsea in contention for the league title.

Loan to FC Köln
On 11 June 2014, 1. FC Köln announced that Kalas would spend the 2014–15 season on loan at their club. On 24 September, Kalas made his debut for Köln II, FC Köln's reserve team, against Borussia Mönchengladbach II; the game ended in a 2–1 win for Köln II. On 25 October 2014, Kalas made another appearance for Köln II against SC Verl; the game ended in a 2–0 loss for Köln II.

Kalas, himself, did not know why he had been given the cold shoulder at Köln, where he played only two reserve games. I don’t know what went wrong." With the lack of playing time, Kalas was linked to a move to multiple English clubs, as well as his former team Vitesse in the January 2015 transfer window.

Loans to Middlesbrough
On 9 January 2015, Middlesbrough announced that Kalas would spend the remainder of the 2014–15 season on loan at the Championship club. The day after signing with the Boro, Kalas made his debut for Middlesbrough in a 0–0 draw against Reading. Manager Aitor Karanka praised Kalas' aptitude to the right-back position, where Middlesbrough had been challenged following a long-term injury to Damià Abella in September 2014.

Kalas retained his position as the right-back against Huddersfield Town and Cardiff City. During the game against Cardiff City on 20 January 2015, Kalas suffered a high ankle sprain. On 10 February 2015, Kalas returned to the starting line-up in a 2–1 away win against Blackpool. On 14 April 2015, Kalas provided an assist to fellow Chelsea loanee Patrick Bamford as Middlesbrough beat Wolves 2–1 at home.

Due to regulations of a short-term loan, Kalas was unable to finish out his season playing for the Boro. Although he missed the final three games of the season, he did ask permission to stay with Middlesbrough and train with the team until the season finished. Kalas played a big role in the Boro making it to the play-offs, although they were unable to beat Norwich City in the final to achieve promotion to the Premier League.

On 13 July 2015, Kalas moved on to Middlesbrough for a second time until the end of the 2015–16 season. 
On 23 July 2015, Kalas signed a new three-year deal at Chelsea, therefore keeping him at the club until 2018. On 9 August 2015, Kalas started against Preston North End in the opening game of the season, where he retained his spot as right-back from the previous season. During the first half of the season, Kalas was the starting right-back, but was dropped later on for the in-form Emilio Nsue. Even though he was playing a lot less, Middlesbrough manager Aitor Karanka stated that Kalas was still important in their chase for promote to the Premier League. On 19 April 2016, Kalas played his last game for the Boro coming on as a late substitute as the Boro held out for the draw against league leaders Burnley.

Although there were talks about Kalas returning to Middlesbrough for a third spell, nothing materialised while Kalas received interest from other teams.

Loan to Fulham
On 13 July 2016, Kalas joined Fulham on a season-long loan, with this being his fifth loan.

On 5 August 2016, Kalas made his debut in a 1–0 home victory over Newcastle United. Kalas made an injury-time block to deny Matt Ritchie's goal-bound shot, as he helped Fulham hold out for the clean-sheet. Kalas missed his first league game on 24 September 2016 after picking up a hamstring injury. On 29 October 2016, Kalas returned from his injury and went on to score his first goal for Fulham in a 5–0 win over Huddersfield Town. Fulham qualified for the playoffs but lost 2–1 on aggregate in the semi-finals to Reading, with Kalas conceding the winning penalty by committing handball.

On 27 July 2017, Kalas signed a new four-year contract with Chelsea and rejoined Fulham on loan for a second season. He was sent off after 39 seconds on 12 August in a 1–1 draw at Reading for a foul on Mo Barrow. Returning to Craven Cottage for a second season, a playoff final win over Aston Villa saw him achieve his second promotion in three seasons.

Bristol City
On 23 August 2018, still in the Championship, Kalas joined Bristol City on a season long-loan along with fellow Chelsea loanee Jay Dasilva. He made 41 appearances in all competitions with the club.

On 1 July 2019, following his successful loan spell, Bristol City confirmed the permanent signing of Kalas for a club-record fee in the region of £8 million. He signed a four-year contract until 2023. He scored his first goal for Bristol City in a 2-1 win against Coventry City on 12 September 2020.

International career

Czech Republic U17
Kalas made his debut for the U-17 on 5 September 2009 coming on as a 61st-minute substitute in a European Under-17 Championship Qualifying match against Belarus which the Czechs won 1–0. He went on to be picked for the final tournament. He played 65 minutes of his 9th appearance, against Greece, before being sent off.

Czech Republic U21
Kalas made his debut for the U-21 on 1 June 2012 in a UEFA U-21 Championship game against the Montenegro which ended in a 2–1 victory for the Czechs.

Czech Republic

Kalas made his senior debut in a 3–0 friendly win against Slovakia at his hometown's Andrův stadion on 14 November 2012, coming on as a substitute for David Limberský in the 74th minute. Kalas was included in the squad during the Euro 2016 qualifiers. On 13 October 2015, he came off the bench replacing Josef Šural, as the Czech Republic held on for the 3–2 victory and winning the group in the process.

Career statistics

Club

International

Scores and results list Czech Republic's goal tally first.

Honours
Chelsea Reserves
Premier Reserve League: 2010–11

Middlesbrough
Football League Championship runner-up: 2015–16

Fulham
EFL Championship play-offs: 2018

Czech Republic U19 
UEFA European Under-19 Championship runner-up: 2011

References

External links

Profile at the Bristol City F.C. website

1993 births
Living people
Sportspeople from Olomouc
Czech footballers
Association football defenders
SK Sigma Olomouc players
Chelsea F.C. players
SBV Vitesse players
1. FC Köln players
Middlesbrough F.C. players
Fulham F.C. players
Bristol City F.C. players
Czech First League players
Eredivisie players
Premier League players
English Football League players
Czech Republic youth international footballers
Czech Republic under-21 international footballers
Czech Republic international footballers
UEFA Euro 2020 players
Czech expatriate footballers
Expatriate footballers in England
Expatriate footballers in Germany
Expatriate footballers in the Netherlands
Czech expatriate sportspeople in England
Czech expatriate sportspeople in Germany
Czech expatriate sportspeople in the Netherlands